Murilo Sebastião Ramos Krieger, SCJ (born 19 September 1943) is a retired Brazilian prelate of the Catholic Church who was the Archbishop of São Salvador da Bahia and Primate of Brazil from 2011 to 2020. He served as archbishop of Florianópolis from 2002 to 2011.

Biography

Early life and priesthood
Ramos Krieger was born in 1943 in Brusque, in the Archdiocese of Florianópolis, Brazil. He entered the seminary of the Congregation of the Sacred Heart of Jesus (the Dehonians), where he did his primary and secondary studies. He studied philosophy in the convent of the Congregation in Brusque, and theology in Taubaté. He also earned a degree in spirituality in Rome and attended university courses in Brazil.

On 2 February 1967 he made his perpetual profession in the Congregation of the Priests of the Sacred Heart of Jesus and on 7 December 1969 was ordained a priest. He was assistant pastor in Taubaté, superior of the Dehonian scholasticate and then rector of the Dehonian Theological Institute in that same city, as well as superior of the South Brazilian Province of the Congregation.

Bishop
On 16 February 1985, he was appointed Titular Bishop of Lysinia and Auxiliary Bishop of Florianópolis by Pope John Paul II, and received episcopal consecration on 28 April. On 8 May 1991, he became Bishop of Ponta Grossa, State of Paraná and, on 7 May 1997, Archbishop of Maringá, also in the State of Paraná. On 20 February 2002 he was appointed Metropolitan Archbishop of Florianópolis, State of Santa Catarina, where he served until 2011.

Archbishop and Primate
On 12 January 2011, Ramos Krieger was appointed Primate of Brazil and Archbishop of São Salvador da Bahia by Pope Benedict XVI. He was installed on 25 March. On 20 April 2015, he became the Vice-President of the National Congress of Bishops of Brazil. He writes monthly for the magazine Messenger of the Sacred Heart (São Paulo-SP), Brazil Christian (Valinhos-SP) and the Journal of the Archdiocese (Florianópolis, SC).

Pope Francis accepted his resignation on 11 March 2020.

References

1943 births
Living people
21st-century Roman Catholic archbishops in Brazil
Brazilian people of German descent
Roman Catholic bishops of Florianópolis
Roman Catholic archbishops of Florianópolis
Roman Catholic archbishops of Maringá
Roman Catholic archbishops of São Salvador da Bahia
Roman Catholic bishops of Ponta Grossa